Juan Evaristo (20 June 1902 – 8 May 1978) was an Argentine football wing half-back who played for Argentina between 1923 and 1930. Along with his younger brother Mario, an outside left, they became the first siblings to appear in a World Cup final.

Club career 
Evaristo played for Sportivo Palermo, Club Atlético Huracán and Sportivo Barracas during the amateur era of Argentine football. In 1931 he joined Boca Juniors helping them to win the first ever professional title in Argentine football. He left Boca for Club Atlético Independiente in 1932 and later played for Argentinos Juniors and Sportivo Barracas where he retired from football in 1937.

He and his brother Mario were in charge of Boca's youth academies for more than 30 years.

International career 
He was a member of the Argentine team, which won the silver medal in the Olympic football tournament. He participated in the first ever World Cup in 1930, where Argentina again finished second behind Uruguay.

Evaristo also played in two editions of Copa América, 1927 and 1929, both won by Argentina.

Honours

Club
Boca Juniors
 Primera División Argentina: 1931

International
Argentina
 Copa América: 1927, 1929

References

External links

Olympic Games profile
Statistics & biography at Historia de Boca 

1902 births
1978 deaths
Footballers from Buenos Aires
Argentine footballers
Argentine people of Italian descent
1930 FIFA World Cup players
Boca Juniors footballers
Club Atlético Independiente footballers
Argentinos Juniors footballers
Footballers at the 1928 Summer Olympics
Olympic footballers of Argentina
Olympic silver medalists for Argentina
Argentina international footballers
Argentine Primera División players
Olympic medalists in football
Medalists at the 1928 Summer Olympics
Association football midfielders